Ellis County (county code EL) is a county located in the U.S. state of Kansas.  As of the 2020 census, the county population was 28,934. Its county seat and most populous city is Hays.

Ellis County is the official German Capital of Kansas.  German immigrants settled in Hays, Ellis, Victoria, and nearby villages in the 1870s and 1880s.

History

Early history

For many millennia, the Great Plains of North America was inhabited by nomadic Native Americans.  From the 16th century to 18th century, the Kingdom of France claimed ownership of large parts of North America.  In 1762, after the French and Indian War, France secretly ceded New France to Spain, per the Treaty of Fontainebleau.

19th century
In 1802, Spain returned most of the land to France, but keeping title to about 7,500 square miles.  In 1803, most of the land for modern day Kansas was acquired by the United States from France as part of the 828,000 square mile Louisiana Purchase for 2.83 cents per acre.

In 1854, the Kansas Territory was organized, then in 1861 Kansas became the 34th U.S. state.  Ellis County was founded on February 26, 1867. It is named for George Ellis, first lieutenant of the Twelfth Kansas Infantry.

20th century
In 1942, the Walker Army Airfield was built northwest of Walker.  Thousands were stationed at the airfield for training of the Boeing B-29 Superfortress during World War II.  The airfield was abandoned and most of it razed.

Geography

Adjacent counties
 Rooks County (north)
 Osborne County (northeast)
 Russell County (east)
 Rush County (south)
 Ness County (southwest)
 Trego County (west)

Major highways
  Interstate 70
  US-183

Airport
Hays Regional Airport is located within the county. Used primarily for general aviation, it hosts one commercial airline United Express, which offers daily jet service to Denver, Colorado.

Demographics

The Hays Micropolitan Statistical Area includes all of Ellis County.

As of the 2000, there were 27,507 people, 11,193 households, and 6,771 families residing in the county.  The population density was 31 people per square mile (12/km2).  There were 12,078 housing units at an average density of 13 per square mile (5/km2).  The racial makeup of the county was 96.10% White, 0.67% Black or African American, 0.21% Native American, 0.82% Asian, 0.02% Pacific Islander, 1.31% from other races, and 0.89% from two or more races. Hispanic or Latino of any race were 2.37% of the population.

There were 11,193 households, out of which 28.80% had children under the age of 18 living with them, 50.00% were married couples living together, 7.80% had a female householder with no husband present, and 39.50% were non-families. 30.10% of all households were made up of individuals, and 10.80% had someone living alone who was 65 years of age or older.  The average household size was 2.35 and the average family size was 2.96.

In the county, the population was spread out, with 22.40% under the age of 18, 18.40% from 18 to 24, 25.20% from 25 to 44, 19.60% from 45 to 64, and 14.30% who were 65 years of age or older.  The median age was 33 years. For every 100 females there were 95.80 males.  For every 100 females age 18 and over, there were 92.60 males.

The median income for a household in the county was $32,339, and the median income for a family was $44,498. Males had a median income of $29,885 versus $21,269 for females. The per capita income for the county was $18,259.  About 6.50% of families and 12.90% of the population were below the poverty line, including 9.20% of those under age 18 and 10.00% of those age 65 or over.

Government

Presidential elections

Ellis County is an anomaly in western Kansas, having voted several times for Democratic presidential candidates, even when the vast majority of the state's 105 counties went for the Republican nominee. This is due to the county's distinctive (in Kansas) German Catholic heritage, contrasting with the Southern “Bible Belt” or Yankee heritage of most rural Kansas counties. It was the solitary county in Kansas to support Catholic Al Smith over Herbert Hoover in 1928, when Kansas was Hoover's strongest state nationwide, and also was won by John F. Kennedy in 1960 by almost thirty percent as one of only two Kansas counties to back the Massachusetts Senator. Ellis County bucked the national and statewide trend by voting for Michael Dukakis over winner George H. W. Bush in the 1988 presidential election, one of only three Kansas counties to go for Dukakis. Ellis County gave a plurality to Bill Clinton over Bush and Ross Perot in the 1992 presidential election, but has been solidly in the Republican column since, giving 66 percent to Republican John McCain to 32 percent for Democrat Barack Obama in the 2008 election, higher than the 57 percent McCain won statewide.

Laws
Wild Bill Hickok served as sheriff in 1870. Ellis County was a prohibition, or "dry", county until the Kansas Constitution was amended in 1986 and voters approved the sale of alcoholic liquor by the individual drink with a 30% food sales requirement.  The food sales requirement was removed with voter approval in 1988.

Education

Unified school districts
 Ellis USD 388
western third of county; small portion in extreme eastern Trego County
 Victoria USD 432
eastern third of county to Russell county line
 Hays USD 489
extends to Rooks and Rush county lines and approximately five miles each way on I-70 from city center

Private schools
 Holy Family Elementary in Hays
 St. Mary's Elementary in Ellis
 Thomas More Prep-Marian High in Hays

Universities and Colleges
 Fort Hays State University
 North Central Kansas Technical College

Communities

Cities
 Ellis
 Hays
 Schoenchen
 Victoria

Census-designated places
 Catharine
 Munjor

Other unincorporated places

 Antonino
 Emmeram
 Pfeifer
 Toulon
 Turkville
 Walker
 Yocemento

Defunct settlements
 Chetolah
 Hog Back
 Rome
 Smoky Hill City
 Stockrange

Townships
Ellis County is divided into nine townships.  The cities of Ellis and Hays are considered governmentally independent and are excluded from the census figures for the townships.  In the following table, the population center is the largest city (or cities) included in that township's population total, if it is of a significant size.

Gallery

See also
 National Register of Historic Places listings in Ellis County, Kansas
 Walker Army Airfield, an abandoned World War II airfield.

References

Further reading

 Standard Atlas of Ellis County, Kansas; Geo. A. Ogle & Co; 71 pages; 1922.
 Standard Atlas of Ellis County, Kansas; Geo. A. Ogle & Co; 58 pages; 1905.

External links

County
 
 Ellis County - Directory of Public Officials
Maps
 Ellis County maps: Current, Historic, KDOT
 Kansas Highway maps: Current, Historic, KDOT
 Kansas Railroad maps: Current, 1996, 1915, KDOT and Kansas Historical Society

 
Kansas counties
1867 establishments in Kansas
Populated places established in 1867